Rimjhim Mitra is a Bengali  television and film actress. In 2010, she participated in a Bengali dance reality show. In 2013, she was the winner of season one of Jhalak Dikhla Jaa Bangla, shown on ETV Bangla. She joined the Bharatiya Janata Party in 2019. Presently, she is working as Disha in Zee Bangla's Krishnakoli and Babli in Star Jalsha's Titli.

Filmography
 Cross Connection (2009)
 Mallick Bari (2009)
 Paglu 2 (2012)
 Keno Mon Take Chay (2012)
 Teen Yaari Katha (2012)
 Jug Jug Jio (2012)
 Final Mission (2013)
 Mahapurush O Kapurush (2013)
 Teen Patti (2014)
 Ei Bhabeo Phire Asha Jaye (2015)
 Ebar Shabor (2015)
 Kalkijug (2016)
 Jio Pagla (2017)
 Cholo Potol Tuli (2020)

Television
 Ekdin Pratidin as Gunja (2005-2007) (Zee Bangla)
 Agnipariksha as Mohona (2009-2014) (Zee Bangla)
 Banhishikha as Diya Sarkar (Protagonist) (ETV Bangla)
 Mon Niye Kachakachi as Sritama / Shree (2015) (Star Jalsha)
 Checkmate as ACP Srija Sen (2015) (Star Jalsha)
 Khuje Beray Kacher Manush (Zee Bangla)
 Behula as Manasha (2012) (Star Jalsha) (Later replaced by Chandrayee Ghosh)
 Bhoomikanya as Ankush's sister-in-law law (2018-2019) (Star Jalsha)
 Kotha Dilam (Akash Aath)
 Babu-Sona (Akash Aath)
 Joy Baba Lokenath as Baro Rani Maa (2018-2019) (Zee Bangla)
 Krishnakoli as Disha Chowdhury (2017-2021) (Zee Bangla)
 Titli as Sunaina Bose Mitra (2021) (Star Jalsha)
 Uron Tubri as Ratri (2022)
 Lokkhi Kakima Superstar as Sonia Roy Chowdhury (2022–present) (Zee Bangla)
 Aalta Phoring as Amrapali Chowdhury aka Pali / Malini (2022–present) (Star Jalsha)

Reality Shows

Mahalaya

References

External links 
 

Living people
21st-century Indian actresses
Indian film actresses
Indian television actresses
Bengali television actresses
Actresses in Bengali cinema
Actresses from Kolkata
Bharatiya Janata Party politicians from West Bengal
Year of birth missing (living people)